The 367th Training Support Squadron, located at Hill Air Force Base, Utah, is a component squadron of the 782nd Training Group; part of the 82d Training Wing at Sheppard Air Force Base, Texas.

Mission
The 367 Training Support Squadron produces interactive multimedia instruction for aircraft and munitions maintenance training for Air Combat Command and Air Mobility Command. It enhances senior USAF and Department of Defense senior leader decision-making through the production of visual information products. It trains and deploys combat camera forces to document worldwide military operations, exercises, contingencies, and humanitarian relief operations.

History

World War II

The squadron was established as a Boeing B-17 Flying Fortress heavy bomb unit in early 1942, training under Second Air Force before deploying to the European Theater of Operations in September 1942, and becoming one of the first heavy bomber squadrons of the VIII Bomber Command's 1st Bombardment Division. The squadron was a highly decorated squadron during the air offensive over Nazi Germany and occupied Europe, engaging in strategic bombardment operations until the end of the war in Europe in April 1945. It then assisted in demobilizing personnel using B-17s as transports along Air Transport Command routes from Western Europe, Italy and the United Kingdom to the Azores and North and West Africa.

After the end of World War II, it became part of United States Air Forces in Europe's military occupation forces in late 1945, where it engaged in photographic mapping and strategic reconnaissance operations over Western occupation zones of Germany as well as the Soviet zone. It then moved to Istres-Le Tubé Air Base, France where it absorbed parts of demobilized squadrons and then returned to Germany as part of the American occupation forces. It demobilized in Germany at the end of 1946.

Strategic Air Command

The squadron was reactivated as a Strategic Air Command (SAC) Boeing B-29 Superfortress squadron at MacDill Air Force Base, Florida in 1948, where it began upgrading to the new Boeing B-50 Superfortress, an advanced version of the B-29 in 1950.  It began receiving the first production models of the new Boeing B-47 Stratojet jet bomber in 1951 and despite initial difficulties, the Stratojet became the mainstay of the medium-bombing strength of SAC all throughout the 1950s. It began sending  its B-47s to AMARC at Davis–Monthan in 1963 when the aircraft was deemed no longer capable of penetrating Soviet airspace. The squadron was not operational after 3 January 1963.

The squadron moved to McCoy Air Force Base after the B-47 was phased out at MacDill. At McCoy, it assumed the mission, personnel and equipment of the 347th Bombardment Squadron becoming a Boeing B-52 Stratofortress heavy bomber squadron. It deployed to Pacific during the Vietnam War, engaging in Operation Arc Light combat missions over North Vietnam. It was also deployed to Thailand, flying out of U-Tapao Royal Thai Naval Airfield for combat missions over Cambodia and Laos. It returned to the United States in 1973, and was phased down for inactivation and inactivated as part of the post-Vietnam drawdown of the USAF. The squadron was not operational after 1 November 1973.

Training support
In January 1997, the Air Education and Training Command Training Support Squadron at Hill Air Force Base, Utah transferred its flying related support functions to the Air Education and Training Command Air Operations Squadron at Randolph Air Force Base, Texas. Three months later, on 1 April, it moved to Randolph, where it assumed the assets of the 619th Training Support Squadron. The 367th Squadron was again reactivated as the 367th Training Support Squadron at Hill, where it assumed the remaining mission, personnel, and equipment of the AETC Training Support Squadron. The squadron is currently located at Hill Air Force Base, Utah.  The 367th supports the Air Combat Command and the Air Mobility Command by providing reliable, unbiased, fact-based performance analysis, identifying root causes of performance deficiencies, and recommending possible solutions. Depending on the root cause identified, the 367th combines Instructional System Design (ISD) with the latest technologies in E-Learning solutions to alleviate specific knowledge and skill gaps. One of its key functions is to create world-class interactive multimedia instruction to improve aircraft and munitions maintenance training.

Members of the squadron's analysis section travel to maintenance units across the Air Force to analyse performance deficiencies and identify training gaps. Once initial analysis is complete, design members interpret the collected data and apply ISD principles to create the framework for products necessary to fill the training gaps and satisfy the needs of the aircraft and missile maintenance communities. This framework is then passed along to the software development and graphics sections to create video footage, code software, and develop the products to bring the designed framework to life. Finally, the near-finished products are scrutinized for technical accuracy, safety compliance, and overall quality by the Evaluation section. Then the product is provided to a focus-group from the target audience for feedback. Once stamped with a seal of approval, products are hosted on the internally-developed and maintained Griffin website for field-level use.

Lineage
 Constituted as the 367th Bombardment Squadron (Heavy) on 28 January 1942
 Activated on 1 March 1942.
 Redesignated 367th Bombardment Squadron, Heavy on 20 August 1943
 Inactivated on 25 December 1946.
 Redesignated 367th Bombardment Squadron, Very Heavy on 11 June 1947
 Activated on 1 July 1947.
 Redesignated 367th Bombardment Squadron, Medium on 11 August 1948.
 Redesignated 367th Bombardment Squadron, Heavy on 1 April 1963.
 Inactivated on 1 July 1974.
 Redesignated 367th Training Support Squadron, Activated on 1 April 1997.

Assignments
 306th Bombardment Group, 1 March 1942 – 25 December 1946
 306th Bombardment Group, 1 July 1947
 306th Bombardment Wing, 16 June 1952 – 1 July 1974
 782d Training Group, 1 April 1997 – present

Stations

 Gowen Field, Idaho, 1 March 1942
 Wendover Field, Utah, c. 6 April–1 August 1942
 RAF Thurleigh (Station 111), England, c. 6 September 1942 (detachments operated from Lajes Field, Azores, 20 August–October 1945; Dakar Airport, French West Africa, September 1945; Marrakech Airport, French Morocco, October 1945)
 AAF Station Giebelstadt (Y-90), Germany, 25 December 1945

 Istres-Le Tubé Air Base (Station 196) (Y-17), France, 26 February 1946
 AAF Station Fürstenfeldbruck (R-72), Germany, 16 August 1946
 AAF Station Lechfeld (R-71), Germany, 13 September–25 December 1946
 Andrews Field (later Andrews Air Force Base, Maryland, 1 July 1947
 MacDill Air Force Base, Florida, 1 August 1948
 McCoy Air Force Base, Florida, 1 April 1963 – 1 July 1974
 Hill Air Force Base, Utah, 1 April 1997 – present

Aircraft
 Boeing B-17 Flying Fortress, 1942–1946
 Boeing B-29 Superfortress, 1948–1951
 Boeing B-50 Superfortress, 1950–1951
 Boeing B-47 Stratojet, 1951–1963
 Boeing B-52 Stratofortress, 1963–1973

See also

 List of B-52 Units of the United States Air Force

References

Notes
 Explanatory notes

 Citations

Bibliography

External links

0367